VMAC may refer to:
 VMAC ("Very high-speed MAC") is a cryptographic message authentication code algorithm
 vMac ("virtual Macintosh") is an open source emulator for Mac OS
 Virginia Mason Athletic Center, often abbreviated VMAC, is the NFL's Seattle Seahawks headquarters and training facilities